1923 in radio details the internationally significant events in radio broadcasting for the year 1923.

Events
1 January – In the United States the well-known American Football Rose Bowl Game is broadcast for the first time, on Los Angeles station KHJ.
4 January – WEAF in New York City and WNAC in Boston simultaneously broadcast a saxophone solo—the first network broadcast.
8 January – First outside broadcast by the British Broadcasting Company: a British National Opera Company production of The Magic Flute from the Royal Opera House, Covent Garden.
18 January – The United Kingdom Postmaster General grants the BBC a licence to broadcast.
20 January – Inauguration of Paris PTT, a station organized by and broadcasting from the École supérieure des postes et télégraphes (the French post office's higher educational institute of engineering). 
8 February – Norman Albert calls the first live broadcast of an ice hockey game, the third period of an Ontario Hockey League Intermediate playoff game, on Toronto radio station CFCA.
13 February – First BBC broadcast from Cardiff, Wales (station 5WA).
6 March – First BBC broadcast from Glasgow, Scotland (station 5SC).
13 March – Production of the first radio set incorporating a loudspeaker. All previously produced sets have required the use of headphones.
14 March – Pete Parker calls the play-by-play of the first ice hockey game ever broadcast on the radio in its entirety, between the Regina Capitals and the Edmonton Eskimos of the Western Canada Hockey League. 
1 April – In Vienna the Czeija & Nissl electrical company begins test transmissions from its premises in co-operation with a technical high school, the Technisches Gewerbemusem. This marks the start of radio broadcasting in Austria.
2 May – WCAE signs on as Pittsburgh's third radio station.
14 May – RCA purchases WJZ from the Westinghouse Electric Corporation; it would also have its city of license transferred from Newark, New Jersey to New York.
18 May – The first regular radio broadcasts begin in Czechoslovakia.
1 June – The publicly owned Canadian National Railways establishes the CNR Radio network to supply programming on its fleet of passenger cars; it is the first national network in North America and precursor to the Canadian Broadcasting Corporation.
3 July – WSAR in Fall River, Massachusetts, makes its first broadcast, having been licensed in the previous month.
21 July – The Dutch radio manufacturing company Nederlandsche Seintoestellen Fabriek begins regular radio broadcasting in the Netherlands.
26 September – In Cleveland, Ohio, S. E. Lawrence and Theodore Willard launch WTAM in the name of the Willard Storage Battery Company.
28 September – First publication of the BBC listings magazine, Radio Times, in Britain.
10 October – First BBC broadcast from Aberdeen in the north of Scotland (station 2BD).
17 October – first BBC broadcast from Bournemouth in the south of England (station 6BM).
29 October – Regular radio broadcasting in Germany officially begins with the first evening transmission from the Sendestelle Berlin installed at the Vox-Haus in Potsdamer Platz.
13 November – Australia's first licensed radio station, 2SB, begins transmission in Sydney.
23 November – In Belgium, French-speaking station Radio Bruxelles begins broadcasting (it will change its name to Radio Belgique on 1 January 1924).
31 December
 KDKA in Pittsburgh conducts the first transcontinental voice broadcast with a station in Manchester, England.
 The BBC broadcasts the chimes of Big Ben from London for the first time.

Debuts
22 March – Hockey Night in Canada is first broadcast on the Toronto Star's private station CFCA.

Births
26 January – Patricia Hughes, English continuity announcer (died 2013)
2 March – Jean Metcalfe, English radio broadcaster (died 2000)
9 May – Johnny Grant, American radio host and producer (died 2008)
10 October – Nicholas Parsons, British entertainer (died 2020)
21 November – Margaret Lyons, born Keiko Margaret Inouye, Canadian broadcast executive (died 2019)
22 December – John Ebdon, British radio broadcaster, Graecophile, author and director of the London Planetarium (died 2005)
25 December – Gordon Baxter, American radio personality, author and columnist (died 2005)

References

 
Radio by year